Manuel Marinho Alves, best known as Maneca (January 28, 1926 – July 14, 1961) was an association footballer in striker role. He was born in Salvador Bahia, Brazil.

During his career (1943–1957) he played for Galícia, Vitória, Vasco da Gama and Bangu. He won four Rio de Janeiro State Championships (1947, 1949, 1950 and 1952) and the South American Club Championship of 1948. For Brazilian team he participated in the 1950 FIFA World Cup, playing 4 games and scoring one goal.

He died in July 14, 1961, after complications from attempted suicide, in his girlfriend's house, on June 28, 1961, by mercury cyanide poisoning.

References

1926 births
1961 suicides
Brazilian footballers
Association football forwards
1950 FIFA World Cup players
Brazil international footballers
CR Vasco da Gama players
Esporte Clube Vitória players
Suicides by cyanide poisoning
Suicides in Brazil